Mondzish (Mangish) is a small group of languages that constitute the most divergent branch of the Lolo–Burmese languages in the classification of Lama (2012). The Mondzish languages are spoken in Funing, Guangnan, Malipo, and Napo counties of China and Hà Giang and Cao Bang provinces of northern Vietnam. The autonyms of Mondzish-speaking peoples often begins with *man-. Lama (2012) considers *man- to be cognate with Mán (蛮), which is an ancient Chinese exonym for non-Chinese peoples to the south. 

Mondzish languages are spoken in Wenshan Prefecture, Yunnan, China and across the border in Hà Giang Province, Vietnam. According to Hsiu (2014), Kathu is related.

Classification
Hsiu (2014:73) classifies the Mondzish languages as follows. Additional languages from Hsiu (2017) are also included.

Kathu (Thou)
Nuclear Mondzish (Nuclear Mangish)
Muangphe
Mango, Manga
Maang (also known as Mo'ang, Meang)
Mondzi or Mantsi (also known as Lô Lô by the Vietnamese) 
Maza
Mauphu, Motang
Mongphu

A revised classification of Mondzish languages by Hsiu (2018) is as follows.

Mondzish
Northwestern Mondzish: Kathu, Thou
Core (Nuclear) Mondzish
Southern Mondzish: Mondzi / Mantsi cluster
Southeastern Mondzish: Meang / Maang cluster
Eastern Mondzish
Mango / Manga cluster
Mongphu
Maza
Central Mondzish
Muangphe
Mauphu, Motang

Sound changes
Lama (2012) lists the following sound changes from Proto-Loloish as Mondzish innovations.
 *
 *
 *

References

Edmondson, Jerold A. 2003. Three Tibeto-Burman Languages of Vietnam.
Hsiu, Andrew. 2014. "Mondzish: a new subgroup of Lolo-Burmese". In Proceedings of the 14th International Symposium on Chinese Languages and Linguistics (IsCLL-14). Taipei: Academia Sinica.
Lama, Ziwo Qiu-Fuyuan (2012), Subgrouping of Nisoic (Yi) Languages, thesis, University of Texas at Arlington.